Tri-State Christian Television, Inc., doing business as TCT Network and TCT Ministries, is a religious television network in the United States. The network was founded in May 1977 by spouses Garth and Tina Coonce.

TCT Network includes traditional televangelism, talk shows, children-oriented programming  such as TCT Kids (used to meet E/I mandates), Southern gospel music, and feature films with Christian themes. TCT has an international service, TCT World, which broadcasts in over 170 countries.

From the mid-1980s to 2007, TCT was an affiliate of the Trinity Broadcasting Network. The network currently maintains a relationship with the Christian Broadcasting Network, airing that network's flagship program The 700 Club twice daily as well as CBN's nightly newscast.

From 2011 to 2013, TCT operated a Spanish-language sub-channel which was available both online and over the air on TCT stations called La Fuente. This subchannel was ultimately discontinued, but reactivated in August 2014 for a simulcast of the Aramaic Broadcast Network (ABN). It was discontinued no later than 2017.

In June 2018, TCT ended local operations at all of its owned-and-operated stations, consolidating all of its stations into a single national feed. The change came after the Federal Communications Commission lifted its Main Studio Rule, which had required broadcast stations to have a local studio.

Television network affiliates

TCT-owned stations 
WFBD channel 48, Destin, Florida / Mobile, Alabama
WBIH channel 29, Selma / Montgomery, Alabama
KDOC-TV channel 56, Anaheim / Los Angeles, California
KTNC-TV channel 42, Concord / San Francisco, California
KAIL channel 7, Fresno, California
WIGL-LD channel 38, Athens / Atlanta, Georgia
WSCG channel 34, Baxley / Savannah, Georgia
KXTF channel 35, Twin Falls, Idaho
WTCT channel 27, Marion, Illinois (Flagship station)
WINM channel 12, Angola, Indiana
WEIJ-LD channel 38 Fort Wayne, Indiana (repeater of WINM)
KDMI channel 19, Des Moines, Iowa
KWKB channel 20, Iowa City, Iowa
WTLJ channel 54, Muskegon / Grand Rapids, Michigan
WJGP-LD channel 26, Kalamazoo, Michigan (repeater of WTLJ)
WAQP channel 49, Saginaw / Flint, Michigan
KCWV Channel 27, Duluth, Minnesota
WFXW channel 15, Greenville, Mississippi
WWJX Channel 23, Jackson, Mississippi
WNYB channel 26, Jamestown / Buffalo, New York
WNIB-LD channel 42, Rochester, New York (repeater of WNYB)
WLXI-TV channel 43, Greensboro, North Carolina
WRAY-TV channel 30, Wake Forest / Raleigh / Durham, North Carolina
WRLM channel 47, Canton / Akron / Cleveland, Ohio
WACP channel 4, Philadelphia, Pennsylvania / Atlantic City, New Jersey
KTTW channel 7, Sioux Falls, South Dakota
 KTTM channel 12 Huron, South Dakota (repeater of KTTW)
WTWV channel 23, Memphis, Tennessee
WWTW channel 34, Senatobia, Mississippi 
KPNZ channel 24, Salt Lake City, Utah
KBCB channel 24, Bellingham, Washington / Vancouver, British Columbia

TCT affiliates 
KZTN-LD channel 20.2, Boise, Idaho (owned by Celebration Praise, LLC)
WBNF-CD channel 15.1, Buffalo, New York (repeater of WNYB, now owned by HME Equity Fund II)
WDWO-CD channel 18.4, Detroit, Michigan (owned by HC2 Holdings)
WLNM-LD channel 27.7, Lansing, Michigan (owned by Gray Television; former O&O repeater of WAQP)
WILX-TV channel 10.7, Lansing, Michigan (owned by Gray Television)
K36NN-D channel 38.1, West Plains, Missouri (part-time affiliation; owned by Promised Land Ministries)
WOCB-CD channel 39.1, Marion, Ohio ''(owned by Central Ohio Association of Christian Broadcasters)

Former TCT-owned or affiliated stations 
W23EM-D channel 23.1, Ceiba, Puerto Rico (now translator of WCCV-TV)
WDYR-CD channel 33, Dyersburg, Tennessee (now defunct)
WJFB channel 44.6, Lebanon/Nashville, Tennessee (affiliation discontinued on November 11, 2020, after a change in ownership.) 
WMDV-LD channel 44, Danville, Virginia (now an independent station)

See also 
 TCT Kids

References 

Television networks in the United States
Lists of American television network affiliates
Religious television stations in the United States
Companies based in Williamson County, Illinois
Marion, Illinois
Television stations in Illinois
Television channels and stations established in 1977
1977 establishments in Illinois
Evangelical television networks